James Patrick Cannon (February 11, 1890 – August 21, 1974) was an American Trotskyist and a leader of the Socialist Workers Party.

Born on February 11, 1890, in Rosedale, Kansas, the son of Irish immigrants with strong socialist convictions, he joined the Socialist Party of America (SPA) in 1908 and the Industrial Workers of the World (IWW) in 1911. He was personally trained by "Big Bill" Haywood, a top IWW leader, and was an IWW organizer throughout the Midwest from 1912 to 1914.

Following his expulsion from the Communist Party USA in 1928, of which he had been a founding member and the National Chairman of its legal entity, the Workers Party of America, Cannon was national secretary of the Communist League of America, Workers Party of the United States and Socialist Workers Party until his retirement and move to California in 1953. He was national chairman emeritus of the SWP when he died in Los Angeles on August 21, 1974.

Political biography

Cannon in the early Communist movement
Cannon opposed World War I from an internationalist position and rallied to the Russian Revolution of 1917. The Bolshevik victory in Russia served to radicalize the Socialist Party of America and brought Cannon back to the organization. He was an active participant in the Left Wing Section of the Socialist Party, an organized faction which sought to transform the SPA into a revolutionary socialist organization. In 1919, he was a founding member of the Communist Labor Party (CLP), forerunner of the Communist Party of America (CPA), although he did not personally attend the Chicago convention of the CLP due to insufficient party tenure in the SPA. He was, however, a part of the CLP's leadership from its earliest days, serving as District Secretary of the CLP for the states of Kansas, Missouri, and Nebraska from the time of founding. He was also the editor of the left-wing Kansas City weekly, Worker's World, from 1919 to 1920, assuming the position when fellow Kansas syndicalist Earl Browder was sent to prison for his previous anti-war activities.

In May 1920, the CLP merged with a section of the CPA headed by C. E. Ruthenberg and Cannon was elected as a member of the Central Executive Committee of the new organization by the founding convention. He worked variously as the St. Louis District Organizer of the UCP in the summer of 1920 and as editor of the organization's labor newspaper, The Toiler, in October of that same year. This brought Cannon to New York City, where he was able to regularly sit on the meetings of the Central Executive Committee. After the merger of the UCP with the remaining CPA organization, headed by Charles Dirba, Cannon was named the first Subdistrict Organizer of the unified organization for Duluth, Minnesota.

Cannon was on the Executive Board of the American Labor Alliance, one of the underground CPA's most important legal organizations, intended to bring mainstream trade unionists into common cause with the persecuted underground communist movement. In December 1921, Cannon delivered the keynote speech to the founding convention of the "legal political party" formed in parallel to the underground CPA, the Workers Party of America (WPA) and was elected National Chairman by that convention.

Cannon was elected by the CEC of the unified CPA as delegate of that organization to the Enlarged Plenum of the Executive Committee of the Communist International (ECCI) and as formal party representative to the Red International of Labor Unions (RILU), leaving the USA in mid-May 1922 and arriving finally in Moscow on June 1. He stayed on there as a delegate of the American party to the 4th World Congress of the Comintern, where he was elected to the ECCI Presidium, serving from August through November 1922. Back in America, Cannon was a member of the Executive Committee of the Friends of Soviet Russia from 1922. He was also a candidate of the WPA for the United States Congress from the New York 10th District in 1922. Cannon remained on the CEC of the WPA throughout this period.

On January 19, 1924, Cannon was named Assistant Executive Secretary of the Workers Party of America, working under his faction rival, Ruthenberg. He was the WPA's candidate for Governor of New York in 1924, and again returned to Moscow as a delegate of the party to the 5th Enlarged Plenum of ECCI, held in March and April 1925.

Cannon was an important factional leader in the American communist movement of the 1920s, sitting on the governing Central Executive Committee of the party in alliance with William Z. Foster, a Chicago-based group which looked to native-born American workers in the unions. Later in the decade, Cannon broke to an extent with Foster, heading up instead the party's legal defense arm, International Labor Defense (ILD). This organization served as a power base for Cannon and his associates. Cannon was the Workers (Communist) Party's candidate for Congress in the New York 20th District in 1928.

Cannon's turn to Trotskyism

While in Russia in 1928, Cannon read a critique of the direction of the Communist International written by Trotsky which the Comintern had mistakenly circulated. He was convinced of the arguments, and attempted to form a Left Opposition within the Workers (Communist) Party. This resulted in his expulsion on October 27, 1928, together with his co-thinkers Max Shachtman and Martin Abern.

Outside of the Communist Party, Cannon, Shachtman, and Abern founded a new political party, the Communist League of America and began publishing The Militant. They came to see Hitler's crushing of the communist movement in Germany as evidence that the Comintern was no longer able to play a revolutionary role internationally and, with the remainder of the Third International under Stalin's control, unable to be internally reformed such that a new International and new parties were required.

Concretely this meant that they no longer considered the Communist League to be a faction of the Communist Party but rather considered it the nucleus of a future revolutionary party. It also meant that they were far more inclined to look at working with other sections of the reviving socialist and workers movements from this point forth. Although the Communist League had been a small organization — opponents dubbing Cannon, Abern and Shachtman "Three generals without an army" — it had won a majority of the Communist Party branch in Minneapolis and St. Paul. Therefore, when the labor movement revived in the early 1930s the Communist League was well placed to put its ideas into action in the Twin Cities and through their influence in the International Brotherhood of Teamsters the union rapidly grew after an historic dispute in 1934. Cannon played a major role in this dispute directing the work of the Communist League on a daily basis, along with Shachtman. In December 1934 the Communist League of America merged with pacifist A. J. Muste's American Workers Party to form the Workers Party of the United States.

Throughout 1935 and into 1936, the Workers Party was deeply divided over the so-called "French Turn." The Trotskyist organization in France had entered the social democratic party of that country — the Section Française de l'Internationale Ouvrière (SFIO) — and while maintaining themselves as an organized faction in the broader organization had made what were felt to be significant gains in advancing their programmatic goals and in winning adherents to their cause among young party members. This tactic had been subsequently endorsed by Trotsky himself, but the American party was deeply divided over the advisability of the maneuver. Jim Cannon was a forceful advocate of this tactic and was embroiled in an inner-party fight to dissolve the Workers Party in favor of entry into the Socialist Party of America. Early in 1936, a convention of the Workers Party finally decided that the organization should enter the SP. This decision came at a cost, however, with a left wing faction led by Hugo Oehler refusing to join the Socialists and exiting to form the Revolutionary Workers League. A. J. Muste became disgusted as well and left the radical political movement to return to his roots in the church.

The Trotskyists' stay inside the Socialist Party lasted only about a year from mid-1936 until mid-1937. Admissions were made on an individual basis, rather than en masse. Chicago attorney and devoted Trotskyist Albert Goldman, who entered the SP about a year earlier than his comrades, launched a factionally-oriented newspaper called The Socialist Appeal, while Cannon headed west to Tujunga, California, a suburb of Los Angeles, to launch a western paper oriented to the trade union movement called Labor Action. Day-to-day operations of the organized Trotskyist faction in the Socialist Party during 1936-37 were handled by Shachtman and James Burnham in New York, while Cannon made what he later deemed as "futile attempts to participate in correspondence in the work of the New York center." 

As the factional situation in the Socialist Party intensified early in 1937, the decision was made by the hostile New York party organization to expel the Trotskyists, which took place late in the spring of 1937. A large percentage of the SPA's youth organization, the Young People's Socialist League left with the expelled Left Wing. (Those expelled had organized a "Federation of NY Left Wing Branches" of the SP and published a Trotskyist edited journal, Socialist Appeal. This became the Socialist Workers Party paper for a number of years after its founding.) James Cannon was noted to have said that when the Trotskyist were expelled from the Socialist Party that, "they had expelled the heart of their party; Trotsky had won over all the serious young activists, leaving only a dead husk" 

In the summer of 1937, Cannon returned to New York from California, where he conducted organizational activities which led to the formation of the Socialist Workers Party at a convention held from December 31, 1937, to January 3, 1938. Jim Cannon was elected as the group's first National Secretary. James Cannon latter wrote that, our round trip through the Socialist party had resulted in gains all along the line. We formed the Socialist Workers Party and began once again an independent struggle with good prospects and good hopes".

Cannon in the SWP
In addition to his activity in the Socialist Workers Party, Cannon was a leading figure in the Fourth International, the international Trotskyist movement, and visited Britain in 1938 with the intention of aiding the unification of the competing British groups. The result was a patched together unification, the Revolutionary Socialist League, which rapidly disintegrated.

In 1940, Shachtman left with a large part of the membership to form the Workers Party, with Shachtman and Burnham arguing that the Stalinists constituted a new bureaucratic class in the Soviet Union while Cannon, like Trotsky, felt that the Soviet Union should be defended despite Stalin's dictatorship and invasion of Finland. This dispute is recorded in Cannon's book The Struggle for the Proletarian Party and in Trotsky's In Defense of Marxism. Nonetheless, Stalinists sought to punish both Cannon and Trotsky for their political opposition to the Stalinist-controlled Third International. Trotsky was killed by one of Stalin's NKVD agents and the CPUSA supported the US government's prosecution of Cannon and other American Trotskyists under the Smith Act. Following the German invasion of the Soviet Union, the largely Soviet-controlled CPUSA started to support US entry into the war. This gave the CPUSA a common interest with the US government, preparing to go to war, whereas Cannon's SWP was aiming to mobilize the working class against the war. Even after his conviction on the charge of conspiring to overthrow the government and resultant eighteen months’ imprisonment during 1944 and 1945, Cannon's influence on the SWP was strong and he wrote to party leaders regularly; for example, recommending changing the party line on the Warsaw Rising. Cannon's book 'Letters from Prison' contains many of these missives.

Following the war, Cannon resumed leadership of the SWP, but this role declined after he handed the post of national secretary in 1953 to Farrell Dobbs. Cannon retired to California in the mid-1950s. However, he remained an active member of the party's Political Committee. Cannon was very much involved in the splits which developed in both the SWP and the FI in 1952. He took a leading role in guiding the public faction supported by the SWP, the International Committee of the Fourth International; and supported the eventual reunification of the two sides in 1963, which led to the formation of the United Secretariat of the Fourth International. He took no part in the various tendency disputes that developed between 1963 and 1967, except to decry firmer organizational norms developed by his erstwhile supporters. These letters are collected in Don't Strangle The Party.

Personal life

Marriage
He was married first to Lista Makimson. They had two children, Karl and Ruth. Lista died of a heart attack. His second wife was Rose Greenberg Karsner Cannon (1890-1969). She was originally from Romania, and came to the United States while still a child. She joined the Socialist Party in 1908, and married the journalist David Karsner in 1911. They had a child, Walta Karsner, but were divorced in 1921. She moved left politically and joined the Communist Party in 1920. She met James Cannon in 1921, and their relationship began that year. She was involved in James Cannon's formation of the Communist League of America and later, the Socialist Workers Party. She served as business manager of The Militant. She moved with James Cannon to California in 1953, and died in 1969.

Death and legacy
James P. Cannon died on August 21, 1974, aged 84. His papers are housed at the Wisconsin Historical Society in Madison and are available on microfilm through interlibrary loan.

Works
A great deal of Cannon's writing has been collected, although volumes were issued non-sequentially by various publishers and are by no means exhaustive. In approximate chronological order of content, providing the publisher and date of first edition, these selected works volumes are:
 The fifth year of the Russian revolution: a report of a lecture New York: Workers Party of America 1923.
Trade unions in America (with James P. Cannon and Earl Browder) Chicago, Ill. : Published for the Trade Union Educational League by the Daily worker 1925 (Little red library #1)
 History of American Trotskyism, 1928–38, Report of a Participant
 Leon Trotsky: memorial address "To the memory of the old man" New York: Pioneer Publishers for the Socialist Workers Party 1940
 Socialism on trial: the official court record of James P. Cannon's testimony in the famous Minneapolis "sedition" trial. New York : Pioneer Publishers 1942
 The workers and the Second World War: speech to the tenth National Convention of the Socialist Workers Party, Oct. 2-4, 1942: with the political resolution adopted by the Convention New York, Pioneer Publishers 1942
 Defense policy in the Minneapolis trial. (contributor) New York, Pioneer Publishers 1942
 The struggle for a proletarian party New York, Pioneer Publishers 1943 (2001 edition with new introduction)
 The end of the Comintern New York, Pioneer Publishers 1943 alternate link
 The Russian revolution New York, Pioneer Publishers 1944
 Why we are in prison: farewell speeches of the 18 SWP and 544-CIO Minneapolis prisoners. New York, Pioneer Publishers 1944
 The History of American Trotskyism: report of a participant New York, Pioneer Publishers 1944
 American Stalinism and anti-Stalinism New York, Pioneer Publishers 1947 alternate link
 The coming American revolution New York, Pioneer Publishers 1947 alternate link
 The Voice of socialism: radio speeches by the Socialist Workers Party candidates in the 1948 election New York, Pioneer Publishers 1948 alternate link
 The road to peace according to Stalin and according to Lenin New York, Pioneer Publishers 1951 alternate link
 America's road to socialism New York, Pioneer Publishers 1953 alternate link
 The I.W.W.: on the fiftieth anniversary of the founding convention New York, Pioneer Publishers 1955 (Pioneer pocket library #4)
 The Debs centennial: written on the 100. anniversary of the birth of Eugene V. Debs New York, Pioneer Publishers 1956 (Pioneer pocket library #5) alternate link
 Notebook of an Agitator. New York: Pioneer Publishers, 1958
 Socialist election policy in 1958 New York, Pioneer Publishers 1958
 Socialism and democracy New York, Pioneer Publishers 1959
 The First Ten Years of American Communism: Report of a Participant. New York: Lyle Stuart, 1962
 Letters from prison, New York, Merit Publishers 1968
 Peace politics vs revolutionary politics: Henry Wallace and the 1948 presidential campaign : report and summary of Socialist Workers Party election policy of 1948 New York, Young Socialist Alliance 1968
Leon Trotsky on labor party: stenographic report of discussion held in 1938 with leaders of the Socialist Workers Party (with others) New York: Bulletin Publications 1968
 Defending the revolutionary party and its perspectives; [documents and speeches of the 1952-53 factional struggle and split in the Socialist Workers Party.]. New York, National Education Dept., Socialist Workers Party, 1968
 Speeches for Socialism. New York: Pathfinder Press, 1971.
 Speeches to the Party: The Revolutionary Perspective and the Revolutionary Party. New York: Pathfinder Press, 1973.
 The fight against fascism in the USA: forty years of struggle described by participants New York, National Education Dept., Socialist Workers Party, 1976
 What is American fascism?: writings on Father Coughlin, Mayor Frank Hague, and Senator Joseph McCarthy New York, National Education Dept., Socialist Workers Party, 1976
 Background to "The struggle for a proletarian party" New York, National Education Dept., Socialist Workers Party, 1979
 Don't strangle the party: three letters and a talk New York, NY : Fourth Internationalist Tendency ; Detroit, MI : Socialist Unity, 1986
 James P. Cannon and the Early Years of American Communism: Selected Writings and Speeches, 1920-1928. New York: Prometheus Research Library, 1992.
 Dog Days: James P. Cannon vs. Max Shachtman in the Communist League of America, 1931-1933. New York: Prometheus Research Library, 2002.

Collected writings and speeches
 The Left Opposition in the US, 1928-31. New York: Monad Press, 1981.
 The Communist League of America, 1932-34. New York: Monad Press, 1985.
 The Socialist Workers Party in World War II. New York: Pathfinder Press, 1975. — Writings from 1940-1943.
 The Struggle for Socialism in the "American Century". New York: Pathfinder Press, 1977. — Writings from 1945-1947.

References

Further reading

 George Breitman, Paul Le Blanc, and Alan Wald "Trotskyism in the United States: Historical Essays and Reconsiderations." New Jersey: Humanities Press, 1996.
 Theodore Draper, The Roots of American Communism. New York: Viking, 1957.
 Theodore Draper, American Communism and Soviet Russia. New York: Viking, 1960.
 David Gillespie, "Challengers to Duopoly: Why Third Parties Matter in America Two-Party Politics." Columbia, SC: University of South Carolina Press, 2012.
 Constance Ashton Myers, The Prophet's Army: Trotskyism in America, 1928-1941. Westport, CT: Greenwood Press, 1977.
 George Novack, "James P. Cannon, 1890-1974: A Tribute," International Socialist Review, vol. 35, no. 9 (Oct. 1974), pp. 6–9.
 Bryan D. Palmer, James P. Cannon and the Origins of the American Revolutionary Left, 1890-1928. Urbana, IL: University of Illinois Press, 2007.

External links

 
 James P. Cannon Internet Archive, Marxists Internet Archive.
 Finding Aid for James P. Cannon Papers, Wisconsin Historical Society, Madison, WI.
 The Lubitz TrotskyanaNet provides a biographical sketch and a selective bibliography of James P. Cannon
 Fred Mazelis, "Interview with Bryan Palmer, Biographer of James P. Cannon, Founder of American Trotskyism," World Socialist Web Site, September 28, 2007.
 The Politics of James P. Cannon by Chris Bambery, International Socialism 36 (1987)

1890 births
1974 deaths
People from Kansas City, Kansas
American anti-war activists
American atheists
American Comintern people
American communists
American male non-fiction writers
American Marxists
American political writers
American political party founders
American Trotskyists
Communist Party USA politicians
Communists from Kansas
Industrial Workers of the World members
Kansas socialists
Members of the Communist Labor Party
Members of the Communist League of America
Members of the Socialist Workers Party (United States)
Members of the Socialist Party of America
Members of the Workers Party of the United States
Socialist Workers Party (United States) politicians
People convicted under the Smith Act
Activists from Kansas